Christmas Fantasy is the seventh and final studio album by American R&B singer Anita Baker. It is Baker's first (and only) Christmas album, and was released on October 4, 2005 by Blue Note Records. The album peaked at number 120 on the Billboard 200, and number 31 on the R&B chart.

For the album, Baker performed several classic Christmas songs such as: "I'll Be Home for Christmas", "O Come All Ye Faithful", "God Rest Ye Merry Gentlemen", and "Christmas Time is Here" (which received a Grammy nomination). "Frosty's Rag" is a re-imagined version of "Frosty the Snowman", and also featured is Baker's rendition of the Broadway Holiday song "My Favorite Things".

The album also includes three original compositions by Baker: "Moonlight Sleighride", "Family of Man" and "Christmas Fantasy".

Track listing
"Frosty's Rag (Frosty the Snowman)" (Jack Rollins/Steve Nelson) - 3:46
"Christmas Time Is Here" (Lee Mendelson/Vince Guaraldi) - 4:38
"I'll Be Home for Christmas" (Buck Ram/Kim Gannon/Walter Kent) - 5:24
"Christmas Fantasy" (Anita Baker/Barry J. Eastman) - 4:34
"God Rest Ye Merry, Gentlemen" (Traditional) - 4:53
"Moonlight Sleighride" (Baker/Eastman) - 6:15
"O Come, All Ye Faithful" (with The Yellowjackets) (Traditional) - 5:38
"Family of Man" (Baker/Eastman/Carol Ricketts/Tiffany Palmer) - 4:49
"My Favorite Things" (Richard Rodgers/Oscar Hammerstein II) - 5:02

Personnel
 Anita Baker – lead vocals
 George Duke – acoustic piano (1, 3)
 Joe Sample – acoustic piano (2, 6, 8, 9)
 Barry J. Eastmond – Rhodes (2, 6, 9), keyboards (3, 4, 7, 8), acoustic piano (5)
 Russell Ferrante – acoustic piano (7)
 Larry Carlton – guitar (1, 2, 3, 8, 9)
 Tim May – guitar (5)
 Phil Upchurch – guitar (5)
 Nathan East – bass guitar (1, 3, 4, 6, 8), acoustic bass (2, 9)
 Reggie Hamilton – acoustic bass (5)
 Jimmy Haslip – bass guitar (7)
 Ricky Lawson – drums (1-6, 8, 9)
 Marcus Baylor – drums (7)
 Rafael Padilla – percussion (3, 7)
 Gene Lobianco – clarinet (1)
 Sharon Bryant – backing vocals (8)
 Tiffany Palmer – backing vocals (8)
 Carol Ricketts – backing vocals (8)

Production
 Executive Producer – Anita Baker
 Producer – Barry J. Eastmond
 A&R – Eli Wolf
 Engineers – Barry J. Eastmond, Al Schmitt and Bill Smith.
 Assistant Engineers – Steve Genelek and Jason Wormer
 Recorded at Capitol Studios (Hollywood, CA); The Village Recorder (Los Angeles, CA); East Bay Studios (Tarrytown, NY).
 Tracks 1-7 mixed by Al Schmitt at Capitol Studios, assisted by Steve Genelek.
 Tracks 8 & 9 mixed by Michael O'Reilly at Avatar Studios (New York, NY), assisted by Peter Doris.
 Mastered by Doug Sax and Robert Hadley at The Mastering Lab (Hollywood, CA).
 Product Manager – Shanieka D. Brooks
 Art Direction and Design – Gordon H. Lee
 Photography – Adrian Buckmaster

References

Anita Baker albums
Blue Note Records albums
2005 Christmas albums
Christmas albums by American artists
Jazz Christmas albums
Contemporary R&B Christmas albums
Albums recorded at Capitol Studios